Charles M. Boerio (March 9, 1930 in Kincaid, Illinois – September 30, 2011) was a former linebacker in the National Football League.

Career
Boerio was drafted by the Green Bay Packers in the twentieth round of the 1952 NFL Draft and was a member of the team that season. He played at the collegiate level at the University of Illinois at Urbana-Champaign.

See also
List of Green Bay Packers players

References

1930 births
2011 deaths
People from Christian County, Illinois
Players of American football from Illinois
American football linebackers
Illinois Fighting Illini football players
Green Bay Packers players